Phillida Nicholson (1924 - 2021) was a Welsh-born artist and Land Girl.

Early life 
Phillida Nicholson was born in Bodfari, North Wales. She was the youngest daughter of Molly and Richard Nicholson.

During World War Two, Nicholson served in the Women's Land Army.

After the war, Nicholson studied at the Liverpool College of Art. Initially interested in sculpture, she later worked with oil painting and as a tapestry designer. Nicholson furthered her studies at the Florence Academy of Fine Arts, the Académie André Lhote in Paris, and at London University.

Career 

Nicholson widely travelled during her career across Europe, Ethiopia, and Australia,  and worked as an archaeological artist on British and American digs.

Her work has been exhibited at multiple locations, including the Redfern Gallery, the Piccadilly Gallery and the Leicester Galleries in London,  the Minories in Colchester, and the Ashgate Gallery in Farnham, Hampshire, with her paintings touring in Wales between 1953-4 and again in 1964.

Notable works 
The Village (1953), National Museum Wales.

The Shepherd (1956), National Museum Wales.

Bore Llachar, Aberdaron (date unknown), Oriel Mon.

Later life 
Nicholson spent her winters in a small studio in Battersea, where she would walk around London and visit galleries.

She developed dementia, and died in early 2021.

References 

Welsh women painters
1924 births
2021 deaths
20th-century Welsh painters
20th-century Welsh women artists
Alumni of Liverpool College of Art
People from Denbighshire